James Lawrence Callan (June 3, 1910 – November 26, 1991) was an American politician.

Early life
James L. Callan was born on June 3, 1910 in Milwaukee, Wisconsin. He went to the Marquette University High School and Marquette University.

Career
Callan became a real estate and security broker in 1931. From 1935 to 1939, Callan served in the Wisconsin State Senate and was a Democrat.

Death
Callan died in Elm Grove, Wisconsin.

Notes

External links

1910 births
1991 deaths
Politicians from Milwaukee
Marquette University alumni
Businesspeople from Wisconsin
Democratic Party Wisconsin state senators
20th-century American politicians
20th-century American businesspeople
Marquette University High School alumni